Hoàng Văn Hoan (1905 – 18 May 1991) was a personal friend of Ho Chi Minh, a founding member of the Indochinese Communist Party, and a Politburo member of the Lao Dong Party (Vietnam Workers' Party-VWP) from 1960 to 1976. Born in Nghệ An Province in 1905, Hoan was a crucial link between the Democratic Republic of Vietnam and China, ambassador to Beijing 1950–1957, and leader of many delegations to China as Vice Chairman of the DRV National Assembly Standing Committee in the 1960s. Known for his pro-Chinese sympathies, Hoan reached the peak of his career in the early 1960s when North Vietnam temporarily adopted a pro-Chinese attitude in the Sino-Soviet dispute.

In 1963, when Foreign Minister Ung Văn Khiêm was replaced by the more pro-Chinese Xuân Thủy, Hoan headed the International Liaison Department of the VWP CC. In 1965–1966, however, Soviet-DRV relations started to improve, accompanied by increasing tension between Hanoi and Beijing. In the new atmosphere, the leadership found it advisable to replace both Xuan Thuy and Hoan with cadres who had been less conspicuously associated with Le Duan's previous pro-Chinese policies.

Still, Hoan remained a prominent actor in Sino-Vietnamese relations for a time. In May 1973, he conducted secret talks in Beijing about the Cambodian Civil War. In 1974, Hoan traveled to China for "medical treatment," but his real mission was probably related to the secret (and unsuccessful) Sino-Vietnamese border negotiations from August to November. He lost most of his influence after the Fourth National Party Congress in 1977, when the Vietnamese Communists shifted to a pro-Soviet position. Like Truong Nhu Tang, who went into exile in Paris, Hoang defected and surfaced in Beijing in July 1979, after shaking off political persecution by the Vietnamese communist authorities.

Hoang charged that Vietnam's abuse of its ethnic Chinese minority was "even worse than Hitler's treatment of the Jews" and that Hanoi had become "subservient to a foreign power," referring to the Soviet Union. Hoang disclosed that in 1982, the Vietnamese Communist Party's Central Committee decided that opium production should be used to raise badly needed foreign currency like U.S. dollars .

Hoang authored his reminiscences as A Drop in the Ocean. He died in Beijing in 1991.

Works

References

External links 
 Hanoi's Push. Time, Aug. 20, 1979.
 Indochina: Five Years of Communist Rule
 Beijing and the Vietnam Conflict, 1964–1965
 Factionalism in North VietnamA

Vietnamese people of the Vietnam War
Vietnamese dissidents
1905 births
1991 deaths
People from Nghệ An province
Vietnamese exiles
Members of the 2nd Politburo of the Workers' Party of Vietnam
Members of the 3rd Politburo of the Workers' Party of Vietnam
Members of the 1st Central Committee of the Indochinese Communist Party
Members of the 2nd Central Committee of the Workers' Party of Vietnam
Members of the 3rd Central Committee of the Workers' Party of Vietnam
Burials at Babaoshan Revolutionary Cemetery
Vietnamese defectors
Vietnamese emigrants to China